Eugene Strong (August 9, 1893 – June 25, 1962) was an American film actor and vaudevillian.

Career 
Eugene Strong oscillated between stage and film work throughout his acting career. He played the lead role in the stage production of The Virginian for two years. He was working in vaudeville in 1915.

Strong's first film was The Crimson Stain Mystery (1916); he received positive notice for his role as a man seduced by a vampire.

Strong returned to vaudeville in the 1920s. Strong worked with Valeska Surrat and supported Surrat in a lawsuit brought against her by Walter Percival in 1920. He was part of the vaudeville act Mann and Strong, with singer Hazel Mann. A Variety review of the play Garage Love states, "Strong, as always, is the personified matinee hero who gets the flappers on sight... Strong is a romantic 'hero' who has few equals. With any kind of luck he should be a 'name' in the native legitimate drama. He has proven it. Even in vaudeville he has done worth-while and outstanding things". A 1925 Billboard review of the act at The Palace Theatre in Cincinnati noted, "Eugene Strong has a likable easy-going manner that does much to put the act over."

He was signed to a five-year motion picture contract with Edward Small in 1926. One of his final films as an actor was The Front Page (1931).

Personal life 
Strong's marriage to Gladys Webster ended in divorce in 1919 on the grounds of his adultery.

Strong was married to Maryland Morne, an actress, until her death in 1935.

Death
On June 25, 1962, Strong died in Los Angeles, California, aged 68. He was buried in Abbey of the Psalms of Hollywood.

Partial filmography

As actor 

 The Crimson Stain Mystery (1916), a serial, as Robert Clayton
 Infidelity (1917) as Ford Maillard
 In the Hands of the Law (1917)
 The Trail of the Shadow (1917) as Henry Hilliard
 Her Mistake (1918) as Ralph Van Cort
 The Border Legion (1918) as Jim Cleve
 Life's Greatest Problem (1918) as Dick Craig
 The Divorcee (1919) as Young Lord Mereston
 A Stitch in Time (1919) as Worthington Bryce
 The Vengeance of Durand (1919) as Captain St. Croix Trouvier
 His Temporary Wife (1920) as Arthur Eliot
 Miss 139 (1921) as Capt. Marlowe
 Damaged Hearts (1924) as David
 The Better Way (1926) as The Boss
 Not for Publication (1927) as Eli Barker
 The Drop Kick (1927) as Brad Hathaway
 Web of Fate (1927) as Don Eddington
 The Warning (1927) as No. 24
 Coney Island (1928) as Tammany Burke
 Crooks Can't Win (1928) as Alfred Dayton Jr
 The Front Page (1931) as Endicott (as Gene Strong)
 Men of America (1932) as Bugs - Henchman
 Let 'em Have It (1935) as 'Dude'

Production 
 Hopalong Cassidy Returns (1936) – Producer
 Trail Dust (1936) – Producer
 Borderland (1937) – Producer
 Ramrod (1947) (as Gene Strong) – Producer
 The Barrier (1937) – Location manager
 Partners of the Plains (1938) – Production manager

References

External links 

Interview from 1928

1893 births
1962 deaths
American film actors

Vaudeville performers